Belihuloya is a village in the Ratnapura District, Sabaragamuwa Province of Sri Lanka. This hillside location is a climatically transitional area, linking both the dry and wet zones and the hill and low country. Belihuloya, is derived from the Belih Oya ("Oya" being the Sinhala word for river), which flows through the area.

Transport
It is located on Colombo Batticaloa Hwy.

Natural attractions
The area around Belihuloya contains a number of waterfalls, including:

 Pahanthuda Ella (also known as Galagama Ella) - The base of this  waterfall is shaped like an oil lamp. The name Pahanthuda is derived from the Sinhala word “pahana” for lamp.
 Surathalee Ella - It is not actually a waterfall but a water-slip.
 Brampton Falls - The tributary of Weli Oya flows down the eastern slopes of Mt Papulagala (1530m) forming several cascades among the trees of the surrounding monsoon forest.
 Papulagala Ella - Located in the Brampton Estate (Tea Plantation) on the slopes of Mt. Papulagala.
Along the road to Non-Perial state about 2 km, car park for this popular bathing place found.

Physical attractions
 Samanala Dam is the second-largest hydroelectric scheme in Sri Lanka, generating 405 GWh of energy annually.

Education
Administratively the university belongs to the Imbulpe Divisional Secretariat and to the Rathnapura District in Sabaragamuwa Province.

References

Populated places in Sabaragamuwa Province